Ladner is a surname of English origin. It's likely Anglo-Saxon and possibly derived from the Germanic word Laden. In England it is most commonly found in the county of Cornwall, whilst in Austria it can indicate someone from various places named 'Laden' or 'Ladendorf'. The name may also be a variant of Lautner. Notable people with the surname include:

 Benjamin Ladner, academic philosopher and theologian
 Bobby Ladner, American football coach
 Don Ladner (1948/1949–2009), New Zealand rugby player
 Jay Ladner (born 1965), American basketball coach
 Joyce Ladner, United States civil rights activist, author, civil servant and sociologist
 Kurt Ladner, a pen name of Nelson DeMille
 Leon Johnson Ladner (1884–1978), Canadian lawyer and Conservative politician
 Luca Ladner (born 1989), Swiss footballer
 Marco Ladner (born 1998), Austrian freestyle skier
 Peter Ladner, Vancouver city councillor
 Richard E. Ladner, of Ladner's theorem in computational complexity
 Wendell Ladner (1948–1975), American basketball player
 William Henry Ladner (1826–1907), English-born miner, farmer and political figure in British Columbia

Surnames of English origin
Surnames of British Isles origin
Anglo-Cornish surnames
Surnames of Austrian origin